The United States maintained its Constitutional Republic government structure throughout World War II. Certain expediencies were taken within the existing structure of the Federal government, such as conscription and other violations of civil liberties, and the internment and later dispersal of Japanese-Americans. Still, elections were held as scheduled in 1944.

Overview
The United States entered World War II with the  Administration that had been at the helm of the nation since 1932, that of Franklin Delano Roosevelt. This administration had been preparing for war for a while by the time of the attack on Pearl Harbor.

President of the United States
President Franklin Delano Roosevelt and Vice President Henry A. Wallace won the election of 1940, and were at the helm of the nation as it prepared for and entered World War II. Roosevelt sought and won a fourth term in office in 1944, but this time with Harry S. Truman as his Vice President. Roosevelt, who had been a victim of Guillain-Barré Syndrome early in life, died in April 1945, and Truman assumed the Presidency through the end of the war.

Cabinet
Secretary of State
Cordell Hull pre-war to November 1944
Edward Stettinius to war's ending a WW2
Secretary of the Interior
Harold Ickes throughout the war
Secretary of Commerce
Jesse H. Jones pre-war to June 1945
Henry A. Wallace to war's end
Secretary of the Treasury
Henry Morgenthau Jr. pre-war to June 1945
Fred M. Vinson to war's end
Secretary of Labor
Frances Perkins pre-war to June 1945
Schwellenback to war's end
Secretary of War
Henry L. Stimson throughout the war
Secretary of the Navy
Frank Knox pre-war to May 1944
James V. Forrestal to war's end
Secretary of Agriculture
Claude Wickard pre-war to June 1945
Anderson to war's end
Postmaster General
Frank C. Walker pre-war to June 1945
Robert E. Hannegan to war's end
Attorney General
Francis Biddle pre-war to June 1945
Tom C. Clark to war's end
Director of the Federal Bureau of Investigation
J. Edgar Hoover throughout the war

Executive Agencies
Foreign Economic Administration under Director Crowley, formed September 1943 from the Office of Economic Warfare, the Office of Lend Lease Administration, and the Office of Foreign Relief and Rehabilitation Operations.
Office of Price Administration under Administrators Henderson, Brown, and Bowles, formed April 1941 (originally named the Office of Price Administration and Civilian Supply).
Office of War Mobilization and Reconversion under Chairmen Byrnes and Vinson, formed in May 1943 as the Office of War Mobilization.
War Production Board under Chairmen Nelson and King, formed in January 1942 from the Office of Production Management and the Supply Priorities and Allocations Board.
Economic Stabilization Board under Chairmen Byrnes and Vinson, formed in October 1942 as the Office of Economic Stabilization.
War Manpower Commission under Chairman McNuff, formed in April 1942.
United States Maritime Commission under Chairman Land.
War Shipping Administration under Administrator Land, formed in February 1942.
Office of Defense Transportation under Chairman Eastman, formed in December 1941.
Petroleum Administration for War under Administrator Ickes, formed in December 1942.
War Food Administration formed in December 1942.
National War Labor Board under Chairman Davis, formed in January 1942.
Office of Scientific Research and Development under Chairman Bush, formed in July 1941.
Office of War Information under Chairman Davis, formed in June 1942.
Office of Civilian Defense under Chairmen LaGuardia and Landis, formed in May 1941.

Joint Chiefs of Staff
The Joint Chiefs were military officers, as opposed to the above, who were for the most part civilians.

Chairman of the Joint Chiefs of Staff William D. Leahy
Army Commander-in-Chief and Chief of Staff George C. Marshall
Navy Commander-in-Chief and Chief of Operations Ernest King
Army Air Force Commander Henry Arnold
Marine Corps Commandant Alexander Vandegrift
Army Air Force Chief of Staff Giles
Army Ground Forces Commander Lear
Army Service Forces Commander Somervell

In addition, the following offices reported to the Joint Chiefs of Staff:

Operations Division, formerly the War Plans Division.
Military Intelligence Division
Office of Naval Intelligence

Politics of World War II
United States home front during World War II
Politics of the United States